Diamon is a village in the Moussodougou Department of Comoé Province in south-western Burkina Faso. The village has a population of 881.

References

Populated places in the Cascades Region
Comoé Province